Abdel Raouf Dafri (born 13 August 1964 in Marseille and raised near Lille) is a French film and television scriptwriter. Born in a family of Algerian  descent and created his first television series La Commune which was aired in 2007 on French television.

Filmography
Television
 Wrote a brief summary of the major points of Commissaire Moulin
 1995 :  Habeas Corpus (court métrage) (Screenplay)
 2007 :  La Commune (Creator) TV Series
 2011 : Braquo, Season 2
 2013 : Gibraltar (Dir: Julien Leclerq)

Film 
 2008 : Mesrine : L'Instinct De Mort (Screenwriter, Dialogue Writer) directed by Jean-François Richet
 2008 : Mesrine : L'Ennemi Public N°1 (Screenplay, Adaptation) directed by Jean-François Richet
 2009 :  Un prophète (Story and Screenplay) directed by Jacques Audiard
 2010 :  L'Aviseur (Screenplay) directed by Julien Leclercq

Director

2020 : Q'un sang impur (May impure blood)

External links
 
 Abdel Raouf Dafri sur www.lavoixdunord.fr

French male screenwriters
French screenwriters
Living people
1964 births
Mass media people from Lille
French people of Algerian descent